The 1974 Cleveland Indians season was the team's 74th season in Major League Baseball. It involved the Indians competing in the American League East, where they finished fourth with a record of 77–85.

Offseason 
 December 12, 1973: Roger Freed was traded by the Indians to the Cincinnati Reds for Steve Blateric.
 March 19, 1974: Walt Williams and Rick Sawyer were traded by the Indians to the New York Yankees as part of a 3-team trade. The Detroit Tigers sent Jim Perry to the Indians. The Yankees sent Jerry Moses to the Tigers. The Tigers sent Ed Farmer to the Yankees.
 March 28, 1974: Mike Kekich was released by the Cleveland Indians.

Regular season 
During the season, Gaylord Perry became the last pitcher to win at least 20 games in one season for the Indians in the 20th century.

Dick Bosman pitched a no-walk no-hitter against Oakland on July 19, winning 4-0.  Only a throwing error by Bosman himself kept it from being a perfect game.

Ten Cent Beer Night 
Ten Cent Beer Night was an ill-fated promotion held by the American League's Cleveland Indians during a game against the Texas Rangers at Cleveland Municipal Stadium on June 4, 1974.

The idea behind the promotion was to offer as many eight-ounce (237 mL) cups of Stroh's beer as the fans could drink for just 10¢ apiece, thus increasing ticket sales. However, the stunt also had the effect of slowly turning the calm and orderly baseball fans into a rowdy and raucous crowd devoid of inhibition.

The game had a special significance for both clubs, as there had been a bench-clearing brawl in a Rangers/Indians game one week earlier at Arlington Stadium in Texas, during a "cheap beer night" there.
In Texas, the trouble had started in the bottom of the fourth inning with a walk to the Rangers' Tom Grieve, followed by a Lenny Randle single.

The next batter hit a double play ball to Indians third baseman John Lowenstein; he stepped on the third base bag to retire Grieve and threw the ball to second base, but Randle disrupted the play with a hard slide into second baseman Jack Brohamer. The Indians retaliated in the bottom of the eighth when pitcher Milt Wilcox threw behind Randle's head. Randle eventually laid down a bunt. When Wilcox attempted to field it and tag Randle out, Randle hit him with a forearm.

Indians first baseman John Ellis responded by punching Randle, and both benches emptied for a brawl. During the melee, the intoxicated crowd became rowdy and threw beer on the Indians' players.

Six days later, the Ten Cent Beer Night promotion induced over 25,000 fans to come to Municipal Stadium for the Rangers/Indians game. Early in the game, the Rangers took a 5–1 lead. Meanwhile, throughout the contest, the crowd in attendance continually misbehaved. A woman ran out to the Indians' on-deck circle and lifted her shirt and a naked man sprinted to second base as Grieve hit his second home run of the game. A father and son pair ran onto the outfield and mooned the fans in the bleachers one inning later.

The ugliness escalated when Cleveland's Leron Lee hit a line drive into the stomach of Rangers pitcher Ferguson Jenkins, after which Jenkins dropped to the ground. The fans in the upper deck of Municipal Stadium cheered, then chanted "Hit 'em again! Hit 'em again! Harder! Harder!"

The Rangers later argued a call in which Lee was called safe in a close play at third base, spiking Jenkins with his cleats in the process and forcing him to leave the game. The Rangers angry response to this call enraged Cleveland fans, who again began throwing objects onto the field. In the bottom of the ninth, the Indians managed to rally and tie the game at five runs apiece, but with a crowd that had been consuming as much alcohol as it could for nine innings, the situation finally boiled over.

After Texas outfielder Jeff Burroughs violently reacted to a fan stealing his glove and cap, the Texas players, led by manager Billy Martin, charged onto the field with bats. A huge number of intoxicated fans, some armed with knives, chains, and portions of stadium seats that they had torn apart, surged onto the field; others hurled bottles from the stands. Realizing the Rangers might be in danger of their lives, Ken Aspromonte, the Indians' manager, ordered his players to grab bats and help the Rangers.

As a result, umpire crew chief Nestor Chylak, realizing that order would not be restored in a timely fashion, forfeited the game to Texas. He too was a victim of the rioters as one struck him with part of a stadium seat, cutting his head. His hand was also cut by a thrown rock.

As Joe Tait and Herb Score called the riot live on radio, Score mentioned the lack of police protection; a riot squad from the Cleveland police department finally arrived to restore order.

Season standings

Record vs. opponents

Notable transactions 
 April 1, 1974: Rich Hinton was released by the Indians.
 April 26, 1974: Chris Chambliss, Dick Tidrow and Cecil Upshaw were traded by the Indians to the New York Yankees for Fritz Peterson, Steve Kline, Fred Beene, and Tom Buskey.
 June 5, 1974: Joe Lis was purchased by the Indians from the Minnesota Twins.
 August 17, 1974: Rico Carty was purchased by the Indians from the Cafeteros de Córdoba (Mexican League).
 September 12, 1974: Ken Suarez, Rusty Torres, and cash were traded by the Indians to the California Angels for Frank Robinson.

Opening Day Lineup

Roster

Player stats

Batting
Note: G = Games played; AB = At bats; R = Runs scored; H = Hits; 2B = Doubles; 3B = Triples; HR = Home runs; RBI = Runs batted in; AVG = Batting average; SB = Stolen bases

Pitching
Note: W = Wins; L = Losses; ERA = Earned run average; G = Games pitched; GS = Games started; SV = Saves; IP = Innings pitched; R = Runs allowed; ER = Earned runs allowed; BB = Walks allowed

Awards and honors

All-Stars 
All-Star Game
 George Hendrick, reserve
 Gaylord Perry, pitcher, starter

Farm system

Notes

References 
1974 Cleveland Indians team page at Baseball Reference
1974 Cleveland Indians team page at www.baseball-almanac.com

Cleveland Guardians seasons
Cleveland Indians season
Cincinnati Indians